The Swimming competition at the 7th Pan American Games was held in Mexico City, Mexico during the Games' run in 1975. It consisted of 29 long course (50m) events: 15 for males and 14 for females.

Results

Men's events

Women's events

Medal table

References
Notes

Bibliography
Folha Online
ISHOF

 
1975 Pan American Games
Swimming at the Pan American Games
Pan American Games
International aquatics competitions hosted by Mexico